The 2019 Austin Elite season was the 2nd in the clubs history since their entry to the Major League Rugby in 2017. The 2019 season is the program's last season under the name Austin Elite. In September 2019, the program announced the club to be renamed to Austin Herd, but was later changed to Austin Gilgronis, due to new ownership. Alain Hyardet was the coach of the club for the second consecutive year. Ben Mitchell was the captain the club for the first year.

The Elite played their home matchups at Dell Diamond in Round Rock, Texas. The program used an alternate stadium to host a game in San Antonio at Toyota Field. 

Austin Elite finished the season winless and became the first time in Major League Rugby to do so.

Schedule

Exhibition

Regular season

Standings

References

Austin Gilgronis seasons
Austin
2019 in sports in Texas